Kampung Madras (Madras Village), formerly known as Kampung Keling, is the Little India of Medan, Indonesia, and one of the city's significant ethnic enclaves. Kampung Madras encompasses an area of approximately 10 hectares, and hosts a large Indian (mostly Tamils). Now a now part of the Medan Polonia district, Kampung Madras is home to many sporting goods resellers, sari stores, and other shophouses.

In the mid-nineteenth century, the colonial Dutch began importing Indian labor to work on Sumatran plantations and to construct roads, trenches, and dykes; today, Sumatra is home to as many as 60,000 people of Indian descent, many of whom reside in Medan.

This area was originally called Patisah, and the name became a district in Medan called Petisah. The enclave's name changed to Kampung Madras to reflect the native land of the people of Indian descent who reside there. However, many people still refer to the place as Kampung Keling, a more derogatory term that may be offensive to some of its residents and others.

Every year, Kampung Madras becomes a meeting point for Hindu and/or Tamil festivals such as Thaipusam, Thai Pongal, and Deepavali.

Location 
Kampung Madras is made of a ten acre landscape beginning the edge of Sungai Soekamoelia off Jalan Palang Merah, precisely the corner of Bank Sumut Medan, eclipsing towards Jalan Diponegoro to the East encircling all the way to Jalan Jendral Sudirman Sekolah Immanuel (Formerly Known as Queen Beatrice School) towards Sungai Babura, covering all the areas towards Jalan Cik di Tiro leading to Titi Berlian on the North rounding up all the way to the Chettiar Kovil in Jalan Kebun Bunga.

Shri Mariamman, an historic temples, stand as an icon of Kampung Madras is located along Jalan Zainul Arifin, as well as other Hindu temples the Kaliamman Temple and the Thedayuthabani Chettiar Temple on Jalan Kebun Bunga.

Kampung Madras is not only home to many Hindu religious shrines, but there are historical mosques as well, to mention; there are 4 mosques, Masjid Agung, Masjid Gaudiah, Masjid South India and Masjid Al-Madras (Cik di Tiro). 5 Historical churches, namely GPIB opposite the governor's office, the Methodist Church at Jalan Hang Tua, GKPS church at Jln. Cik di Tiro, GKI at Jalan Zainul Arifin as well as Gereja Baptis at Jalan Diponegoro, all are located within Kampung Madras, we can see here too a Punjabi Gurudwaar, as well as a Buddhist shrine, Temple of Gunung Timor at Jalan Hang Tuah that makes Kampung Madras a complete visit for all religious sites.

There is also Khalsa Indian school, later changed to be Khalsa National School, that has a long history of producing the most English speakers of the resident of Medan and beyond, precisely located next to the Gurduwara in Kampung Madras.

Temples 
Several Hindu temples are located in Kampung Madras:
 Sri Mariamman Temple 
 Thandayuthapani Temple 
 Sri Kaliamman Temple 
 Maha Muniswarar Temple

Mosques 
Two mosques serve the enclave: Jami Mosque, built in 1887, and Ghaudiyah Mosque. Both mosques were built by early South Indian Muslims in Medan.

See also 
 Pasar Baru, another Little India in Jakarta, Indonesia

References

Medan
Little Indias